JNJ-7777120 was a drug being developed by Johnson & Johnson Pharmaceutical Research & Development which acts as a potent and selective antagonist at the histamine H4 receptor. It has anti-inflammatory effects, and has been demonstrated to be superior to traditional (H1) antihistamines in the treatment of pruritus (itching). The drug was abandoned because of its short in vivo half-life and hypoadrenocorticism toxicity in rats and dogs, that prevented advancing it into clinical studies.

See also 
 VUF-6002

References

Carboxamides
Chloroarenes
H4 receptor antagonists
Indoles
Johnson & Johnson brands
Piperazines
Abandoned drugs